Trevor Reid (25 January 190816 April 1965) was an English actor. He was born in Liverpool, the son of David Reid and Grace Adelaide (née Thomas) at 25 Cheltenham Avenue near to Sefton Park. After leaving school he worked for four years at the Liverpool Cotton Exchange, then joined the Liverpool Playhouse Company in 1929 where he stayed for two seasons under the direction of William Armstrong. He served with the Royal Artillery in the Second World War and after discharge resumed his acting career. He acted in 47 films from 1938 to 1965. He died at age 57 in London.

Selected filmography

 Dangerous Cargo (1954) - Watson
 Meet Mr. Callaghan (1954) - Det. Inspector Gringall
 Delayed Action (1954) - Goodman (uncredited)
 Radio Cab Murder (1954) - Commissioner
 The Gilded Cage (1955) - Inspector Brace
 The Hornet's Nest (1955) - Detective Sergeant Filson
 The Narrowing Circle (1956) -Inspector 'Dumb' Crambo 
 Private's Progress (1956) - Adjutant (uncredited)
 Bond of Fear (1956) - Dover Police Inspector
 Behind the Headlines (1956) - Bunting
 Satellite in the Sky (1956) - Simmons - Technician (uncredited)
 How to Murder a Rich Uncle (1957) - Inspector Harris
 A Question of Adultery (1958) - Reporter (uncredited)
 Bobbikins (1959) - Cavendish (uncredited)
 Piccadilly Third Stop (1960) - Bride's Father
 Strip Tease Murder (1961) - Inspector Forbes
 Mary Had a Little... (1961) - Dr. Liversidge
 Dangerous Afternoon (1961) - Inspector Craven
 The Longest Day (1962) - General Sir Bernard L. Montgomery (uncredited)
 The Fast Lady (1962) - Examiner
 Tomorrow at Ten (1963) - Q detective
 Night Train to Paris (1964) - Policeman on train
 Walk a Tightrope (1964) - Inspector MacMitchell (final film role)

References

External links

1908 births
1965 deaths
Male actors from Liverpool
English male film actors
English male television actors
20th-century English male actors